Magnus Gustafsson was the defending champion, but the sixth seeded Swede lost in the second round to Jacco Eltingh. Karel Nováček won the singles event at the 1992 Dutch Open defeating  Jordi Arrese in the final 6–2, 6–3, 2–6, 7–5 and captured his second title in Hilversum.

Seeds
Champion seeds are indicated in bold while text in italics indicates the round in which that seed was eliminated.

Draw

Finals

Section 1

Section 2

External links
 ATP main draw

Singles